Axinidris acholli is a species of ant in the genus Axinidris. Described by Weber in 1941, the species is endemic to Kenya and Sudan, where specimens originally collected were observed foraging. above ground vegetation

References

Axinidris
Hymenoptera of Africa
Insects described in 1941